Colin S. Cooper is a leading cancer researcher who is currently Professor of Cancer Genetics at Norwich Medical School at the University of East Anglia.

Cooper studied science at the University of Warwick and completed his PhD in biochemistry at the University of Birmingham in 1978. He formerly worked at the Institute of Cancer Research, and was Chair of Molecular Biology at the University of London.

He has an h-index of 114 according to Google Scholar.

References

Year of birth missing (living people)
Living people
Alumni of the University of Warwick
Alumni of the University of Birmingham
Academics of the University of London
Academics of the University of East Anglia